Aber Whitcomb (born 1977) is the CTO and Co-Founder of Jam City, Inc (formerly SGN Games). As CTO of Jam City Inc, a multi-platform game developer and distributor, Aber Whitcomb oversees the cross-platform technology strategy and plays a key role in developing and operating Jam City titles on a global scale. Whitcomb is a recognized expert in large scale computing, networking and storage and frequently speaks on these topics at industry events. He has been profiled in publications such as VentureBeat, The New York Times, and SoCalTech.

Prior to Jam City, Whitcomb's most recent role was CTO and co-founder of MySpace where he was responsible for the engineering and technical operations groups.  InfoWorld named Whitcomb as one of the "Top 25 CTOs of 2009."

Whitcomb is a co-founder of Core Scientific, a blockchain and artificial intelligence hosting, transaction processing and application development company that has raised $100 million in funding. Whitcomb is also a co-founder of i/o Ventures, an early stage startup program that focuses heavily on mentorship.  He graduated from the University of Washington and was born and raised in Bellingham, WA.

References 

1977 births
Businesspeople from Los Angeles
Living people
University of Washington alumni
People from Bellingham, Washington